Judo at the 2011 All-Africa Games in Maputo, Mozambique was held on September 4–6, 2011.

Medal summary

Men

Women

Medal table

References

External links
 

2011 All-Africa Games
All-Africa Games
2011